This discography of the Riverside Records label includes the two principal 12" LP series. The main label's mono series had a 12- (later RLP 12-) prefix and the RLP 1100 series consisted of stereo issues (not given here) of albums also released in mono. The Jazzland subsidiary is also listed, but the earlier 10" series are omitted. They principally were the 1000 series of reissues of early jazz, and the 2500 series of new recordings unrestricted to a single style. Albums issued on the subsidiary Battle (largely gospel), Judson and Washington labels are also omitted, as are the 100 series (12" reissues of early jazz), 600 series (folk music), and 800 series (primarily folk, cabaret, and comedy).

Discography

External links
Discogs

Jazz discographies
Discographies of American record labels